Many notable people have been associated with Carleton College, located in Northfield, Minnesota.

Notable alumni

Academia
 Lila Abu-Lughod, 1974, author, scholar and expert on the Arab world
Robert C. Allen, 1969, professor of economic history at New York University Abu Dhabi
R. Michael Alvarez, 1986, professor of political science at California Institute of Technology
James C. Anthony, 1971, professor in the Department of Epidemiology at Michigan State University
Daniel A. Arnold, 1988, philosopher at the University of Chicago
Frank Edward Brown, 1929, preeminent Mediterranean archaeologist
Penelope Brown, 1965, anthropologist, co-creator of the theory of politeness
David M. Carr, 1980, professor of Old Testament at the Union Theological Seminary
Arland F. Christ-Janer, 1943, president of the College Entrance Examination Board and sixth president of Boston University 
Kimberly Clausing, 1991, professor of economics at Reed College
Geoffrey Claussen, 2001, professor of religious studies at Elon University
Michael Cunningham, social psychologist and professor in the Department of Communications at the University of Louisville
Anthony Downs, 1952, author of An Economic Theory of Democracy, senior fellow at the Brookings Institution
 Buell G. Gallagher, 1925, President of Talladega College; President of City College of New York
 Regan Gurung, 1991, professor of psychology and author
 Susan Hekman, 1971, professor of political science and director of the graduate humanities program at the University of Texas at Arlington
 John Lavine, 1963, Dean of Medill School of Journalism
Alfred R. Lindesmith, 1927, professor of sociology at Indiana University known for contributions to the study of drug addiction
 Dennis Meadows, 1964, co-author of The Limits to Growth
 Donella Meadows, 1963, lead author of The Limits to Growth
 Thomas Mengler, 1975, President of St. Mary's University (Texas), former Dean of Law at University of St. Thomas and former dean of the University of Illinois College of Law
 William G. Moseley, 1987, writer and professor of geography at Macalester College
Robert Paarlberg, 1967, professor of political science at Wellesley College, researcher of international agricultural and environmental policy
Kathy Peiss, 1975, professor of American history at The University of Pennsylvania; former chair of the history department and winner of a Guggenheim Fellowship
William B. Pickett, 1962, historian and professor emeritus at Rose-Hulman Institute of Technology, Terre Haute, Indiana 
Lucian Pye, 1943, political scientist and renowned sinologist, taught at Massachusetts Institute of Technology for 35 years
Katherine Rowe, 1984, first female President of The College of William & Mary
Laura Ruetsche, 1987, chair of the philosophy department at the University of Michigan
 Jay Rubenstein, 1989, historian, recipient of the MacArthur Fellowship
Stephen Thorsett, 1987, President of Willamette University, physicist, astronomer, former dean of UC Santa Cruz Division of Physical and Biological Sciences
 Thorstein Veblen, 1880, economist and author of The Theory of the Leisure Class
 Adam Arkin, 1988, Dean A. Richard Newton Memorial Chair Professor at University of California, Berkeley and CEO/CSO of DOE Systems Biology Knowledgebase

Arts

 Jack Carson, 1932, actor, star of many films including Mildred Pierce, Cat on a Hot Tin Roof, A Star Is Born
 Lincoln Child, 1979, New York Times Bestselling author of techno-thrillers
 Jimmy Chin, 1996, National Geographic photographer, documentary filmmaker, and mountain climber
 Masanori Mark Christianson, 1998, musician/creative director, member of indie band Rogue Wave
 Stuart Comer, 1990, chief curator at the Museum of Modern Art (MoMA)
 Bob Daily, 1986, television producer and screenwriter for Desperate Housewives, Frasier, and Superior Donuts
 Pamela Dean, 1975, fantasy writer
 Brian Freeman, 1984, suspense fiction author
 Piotr Gajewski, 1981 founder, director and artistic director of the National Philharmonic Orchestra
 Robert Gottschalk, 1939, Academy Award winner and founder of Panavision
 Peter Gwinn, 1993, writer for The Colbert Report
 Jane Hamilton, 1979, novelist and winner of the Hemingway Foundation/PEN Award, author of The Book of Ruth
 Hal Higdon, 1953, runner and writer
 Loyce Houlton, 1946, choreographer and founder of the Minnesota Dance Theatre
 Christopher Kratt, 1992, TV and film producer, host of Zoboomafoo and Wild Kratts
 Naomi Kritzer, 1995, Locus Award and Hugo Award-winning author of speculative fiction, and blogger
 Clare Walker Leslie, 1968, naturalist and nature writer
 Grace Llewellyn, 1986, author of The Teenage Liberation Handbook
 James Loewen, 1964, historian and author of Lies My Teacher Told Me
 Erica Lord, 2001, artist
 Zach McGowan, 2002, actor, roles in television shows including Black Sails and Agents of S.H.I.E.L.D.
 Beverly Naidus, 1975, artist
 Barrie M. Osborne, 1966, producer of the Lord of the Rings film trilogy
 Parker Palmer, 1961, author, founder of the Center for Courage & Renewal
 Andrij Parekh, 1994, cinematographer for popular television (13 Reasons Why), film (The Zookeepers Wife), and music videos (Electric Feel for MGMT)
 T.J. Stiles, 1986, non-fiction writer, two-time winner of the Pulitzer Prize, for Biography in 2010 and for History in 2016
 Marilyn Stokstad, 1950, art historian
 Peter Tork, of The Monkees, was a student at Carleton from 1960 to 1963 (then known as Peter Thorkelson)
 Laura Veirs, 1997, singer-songwriter, member of supergroup case/lang/veirs
 Wendy West, 1994, American television producer and Emmy award nominated writer of the Showtime drama, Dexter
 Patricia Collins Wrede, 1974, fantasy writer, author of The Enchanted Forest Chronicles
 Karen Tei Yamashita, 1973, novelist, author of I Hotel and Tropic of Orange
 Kao Kalia Yang, 2003, Hmong American writer and author of The Latehomecomer: A Hmong Family Memoir and The Song Poet

Journalism 

 Kai Bird, 1973, Pulitzer Prize-winning biographer and journalist

Jonathan Capehart, 1989, journalist, winner of the 1999 Pulitzer Prize for Editorial Writing
Maya Dusenbery, 2008, executive director of the feminist blog, Feministing
Jack El-Hai, 1979, writer and journalist
Michael Gartner, 1960, journalist, former president of NBC news, winner of the Pulitzer Prize for Editorial Writing
Dara Moskowitz Grumdahl, 1992, James Beard Award-winning food writer
John F. Harris, 1985, editor-in-chief of Politico
Clara Jeffery, 1989, editor of Mother Jones magazine
Brian Klaas, 2008, columnist at the Washington Post, assistant professor at University College London
Margaret Manton Merrill, 1873, journalist
Peter Schjeldahl, 1965, art critic for The New Yorker, finalist for the 2022 Pulitzer Prize for Criticism
Joseph Shapiro, 1975, investigations correspondent for NPR News, finalist for the 2022 Pulitzer Prize in National Reporting
Garrick Utley, 1961, journalist, former host of Meet the Press

Business
Arnold W. Donald, 1976, CEO of Carnival Corporation & plc cruise company
Robert K. Greenleaf, 1926, corporate management expert, founder of the Greenleaf Center for Servant Leadership
Laura Silber, 1982, Chief Communications Operator for the Open Society Foundations
Brandon Sun, 2007, SPAC Banker at the helm of the Deutsche Bank Strip Club Scandal

Politics and Government
Chude Pam Allen, 1965, activist, Freedom Summer participant and involved in the women's liberation movement
C. S. Amsden, South Dakota politician
Ellen Anderson, 1982, Minnesota politician
Michael Armacost, 1958, former Under Secretary of State (Policy); former ambassador to Japan and the Philippines; President of the Brookings Institution from 1995 to 2002; and former Chairman of the Board of Trustees at Carleton from 2004 to 2008
 Jack Barnes, 1961, the leader of the Socialist Workers Party
 Duane C. Butcher, 1987, U.S. chargé d'affaires in Romania from 2012 to 2014, and in Uzbekistan from 2010 to 2011
 John A. Gale, 1962, Secretary of State of Nebraska since 2000
 Susan Golding, 1966, two-term mayor of San Diego
 Rush Holt, Jr., 1970, U.S. Representative for New Jersey's 12th congressional district from 1999 to 2015; CEO of the American Association for the Advancement of Science (AAAS) and executive publisher of the Science family of journals since 2015
 Eleanor Kinnaird, 1953, North Carolina State Senator
 Warren P. Knowles, 1930, governor of Wisconsin from 1965 to 1971
Jimmy Kolker, 1970, former ambassador to Burkina Faso and Uganda, former chief of HIV/AIDs section at UNICEF, currently Assistant Secretary for Global Affairs at the U.S. Department of Health and Human Services
 Melvin R. Laird, 1942, President Nixon's Secretary of Defense from 1969 to 1973
Todd Larson, 1983, LGBT activist, served on the board of directors of the International Gay and Lesbian Human Rights Commission from 2007 to 2013
 Jack Lew, United States Secretary of the Treasury and 25th White House Chief of Staff; transferred to Harvard College after his freshman year
 Fue Lee, 2013, Hmong-American politician, Minnesota House of Representatives from 2016
 Ernest Lundeen, 1901, Minnesota politician; U.S. Representative 1917-1919 and 1933-1937; U.S. Senator from 1937 until his death in 1940
 Karl E. Mundt, 1923, U.S. Representative 1938-1948; U.S. Senator 1948-1973 for South Dakota
 Tom Nelson, 1998, former Wisconsin State Representative and Assembly Majority Leader
 John C. Raines, 1955, professor at Temple University, activist who broke into an F.B.I. office and exposed abuses of power
 Paul Tewes, 1993, Democratic political consultant
 Sheldon B. Vance, 1939, U.S. Ambassador to Zaire from 1969 to 1974
Liz Watson, 1996, Democratic nominee for Indiana's 9th Congressional District

Law
Lynn H. Ashley, 1909, district attorney for St. Croix County, Wisconsin
Pierce Butler, 1887, Supreme Court Justice from 1923 to 1939
 Ben C. Duniway, 1928, Judge of the United States Court of Appeals for the Ninth Circuit
 Audrey Fleissig, 1976, Judge of the United States District Court for the Eastern District of Missouri
Elizabeth L. Gleicher, 1976, judge on the Michigan Court of Appeals
 Herbert Goodrich, 1911, Judge of the United States Court of Appeals for the Third Circuit, Director of the American Law Institute, Chair of the drafting committee of the Uniform Commercial Code
Gordon Moore (judge), 1985, Associate Justice of the Minnesota Supreme Court
 Brenda Sannes, 1980, Judge of the United States District Court for the Northern District of New York
Cordenio Severance, 1880, former President of the American Bar Association
 Stephen Six, 1988, Kansas Attorney General from 2008 to 2011

Science
 Walter Alvarez, 1962, geologist credited with the theory that an asteroid impact was the likely cause of the Cretaceous-Tertiary extinction event
Evelyn Anderson, 1921, physiologist and biochemist, co-discoverer of andrenocorticotropic hormone (ACTH)
Kinsey Anderson, 1949, pioneer space physicist and member of the National Academy of Sciences
Linda Bartoshuk, 1960, psychologist at the University of Florida, specializes in smell and taste
Elizabeth Beise, 1981, professor of physics at the University of Maryland, College Park
Robert G. Bergman, 1963, professor of chemistry emeritus at UC Berkeley, winner of the Wolf Prize in Chemistry
Ann T. Bowling, 1965, leading geneticist on the study of horses, one of the leaders of the horse genome project
Kenneth G. Caulton, professor of inorganic chemistry at the Indiana University
Joy Crisp, 1979, planetary geologist
Carl R. Eklund, 1932, leading ornithologist and member of one of the longest recorded Antarctic sled dog journeys, namesake of the Eklund Islands
Sarah K. England, 1988, physiologist and biophysicist; professor of obstetrics and gynecology at Washington University in St. Louis
Barbara Fredrickson, 1986, social psychologist studying emotions and positive psychology at University of North Carolina Chapel Hill
Alan Gelperin, 1962, professor at Princeton University, specializes in olfaction, known for electronic scent detection and identification
David Gerdes, 1986, astrophysicist and professor of physics at the University of Michigan
 Todd Golub, 1985, professor of pediatrics at Harvard, known for applying the tools of genomics to study cancer
 Robert Edward Gross, 1927, highly distinguished surgeon and one of the pioneers of cardiac surgery
James V. Haxby, 1973, neuroscientist known for face perception, Director of the Dartmouth Brain Imaging Center at Dartmouth College
Stephen P. Hubbell, 1963, ecologist, author of the unified neutral theory of biodiversity, founder of what would become the National Council for Science and the Environment
Kathy Hudson, 1982, American microbiologist specializing in science policy, former deputy director for science, outreach, and policy at the National Institutes of Health, assisted in the creation of All of Us, the BRAIN initiative, the National Center for Advancing Translational Sciences, and founded the Genetics and Public Policy Center at Johns Hopkins University
 Mary-Claire King, 1967, human geneticist, discoverer of BRCA1
Yvonne Connolly Martin, 1958, expert in the field of cheminfomatics
 Eric Pianka, 1960, biologist, herpetologist and well-known evolutionary ecologist known as "the Lizard Man;" pioneered work on r/K selection theory
Kenneth Poss, 1992, biologist, James B. Duke Professor in the Department of Cell Biology at Duke University, known for his work on regeneration. AAAS Fellow.
Peter H. Schultz, 1966, Brown University geology professor; co-investigator to the NASA Science Mission Directorate spacecraft Deep Impact; awarded the Barringer Medal of the Meteoritical Society in 2004
 Christine Siddoway, 1984, geologist and Antarctic researcher
Douglas Vakoch, 1983, astrobiologist, president of METI (Messaging Extraterrestrial Intelligence)
Simine Vazire, 2000, psychologist at the University of California, Davis with research in self-perception and self-knowledge
 Ray Wendland, 1933, experimental petrochemist and academic
Sidney Wolff, 1962, astrophysicist, first woman to be named director of the National Optical Astronomy Observatory and the first director of the Gemini Project
Anne Sewell Young, 1892, astronomy professor at Mt. Holyoke College and founding member of the American Association of Variable Star Observers

Religion 

Dale Ahlquist, 1980, author, scholar of G. K. Chesterton
Kirbyjon Caldwell, 1975, pastor of the Windsor Village United Methodist Church in Houston, Texas; spiritual advisor to Presidents George W. Bush and Barack Obama
Arcturus Z. Conrad, 1882, theologian, pastor at Park Street Church in Boston, Massachusetts
Henry H. Riggs, 1902, Christian missionary and historical witness to the Armenian genocide of the early 20th century
Margaret Towner, 1948, religious leader, first woman minister to be ordained by the northern branch of the American Presbyterian Church
Tsune Watanabe, 1891, President of the Congregational Woman's Missionary Society of Japan, temperance activist, educator

Sports

Stub Allison, 1917, head football coach at UC Berkeley (1935-1944), his 1937 team won the Rose Bowl in 1938
Osborne Cowles, 1922, athlete and coach for Carleton; basketball head coach at University of Minnesota, Michigan and Dartmouth
Freddie Gillespie, NBA player for Toronto Raptors; Transferred to Baylor University after his Sophomore year.
Philip Dunn, 1993, competed in 2000, 2004, 2008 Olympics in the race walking event.

Other
Donald H. Elliott, 1954, urban planner
Jane Elizabeth Hodgson, 1934, physician; Founding Fellow of American College of Obstetricians and Gynecologists; pioneer in women's reproductive health; abortion rights advocate
 Anthony Myint, 1999, restaurateur, founder of Mission Street Food, Mission Chinese Food and Commonwealth in San Francisco; author of Mission Street Food

Fictional
 Ben Wyatt, a likable yet neurotic government worker played by Adam Scott on the television series Parks and Recreation, is revealed to be a Carleton alumnus in a season six episode. He had previously been shown wearing a fictionalized Carleton College Intramural Champions tee-shirt.

Notable faculty
 Ian Barbour, professor of religion; 1989–91 Gifford Lecturer on religion and science; winner of the 1999 Templeton Prize for Progress in Religion
Charles Christopher Mierow, professor of biography from 1934-1951, former president of Colorado College from 1925-1933; eminent historian, translator and linguist
 H. Scott Bierman, professor of economics, department chair, academic dean; game theory expert; President of Beloit College 2009–present
 David Bryn-Jones, biographer of U.S. Secretary of State Frank B. Kellogg; taught history, economics, and international relations at Carleton from 1920 to 1951
 John Bates Clark, economist; taught Thorstein Veblen
 Frank Daniel, Czech born writer, producer, director, and teacher; developer of the sequence paradigm of screenwriting
 Albert Elsen, assistant professor of art history from 1952 to 1958
 Laurence McKinley Gould, second-in-command to Richard E. Byrd on his first landmark expedition to Antarctica; professor of geology; Carleton College President from 1945-1962
 Roy Grow, former Kellogg Professor of International Relations and director of International Relations; former military interpreter; expert on Asia
 Deanna Haunsperger, President of the Mathematical Association of America
 Ian Holbourn, writer; Laird of Foula; instrumental in creating the art department
 Gao Hong, composer and performer of Chinese music, among the world's top pipa players
 Burton Levin, former United States Consul General to Hong Kong and US Ambassador to Burma 1987-1990; currently the SIT Investment Visiting Professor of Asian Policy
 Maria Lugones, feminist philosopher; professor of philosophy from 1973 to 1993
 Louis E. Newman, John M. and Elizabeth W. Musser Professor of Religious Studies, Emeritus
 Gregory Blake Smith, novelist and short story writer; Lloyd P. Johnson Norwest Professor of English and the Liberal Arts
 Paul Wellstone, U.S. Senator from Minnesota from 1991 until his death in 2002; professor of political science from 1969 to 1990
 Reed Whittemore, professor of English; poet; Poet Laureate Consultant in Poetry to the Library of Congress in 1964 and 1984

Presidents of the College
 James Woodward Strong, 1870–1903
 William Henry Sallmon, 1903–1908
 Donald Cowling, 1909–1945
 Laurence McKinley Gould, 1945–1962
 John Nason, 1962–1970
 Howard R. Swearer, 1970–1977
 Robert Edwards, 1977–1986
 David H. Porter, 1986–1987
 Stephen R. Lewis Jr., 1987–2002
 Robert A. Oden Jr., 2002–2010
 Steven G. Poskanzer, 2010–2021
 Alison Byerly, 2021-present

References

Carleton College people